The Central District of Bafq County is in Yazd province, Iran. At the National Census in 2006, its population was 36,930 in 9,743 households. The following census in 2011 counted 41,876 people in 12,288 households. At the latest census in 2016, the district had 50,845 inhabitants in 15,156 households.

References 

Bafq County

Districts of Yazd Province

Populated places in Yazd Province

Populated places in Bafq County